Hugo Alejandro Zepeda Barrios (born 4 June 1907–9 January 1998) was a Chilean politician and lawyer who served as President of the Senate of Chile.

References

External links
 BCN Profile

1907 births
1998 deaths
People from Ovalle
Liberal Party (Chile, 1849) politicians
Republican Party (Chile, 1982) politicians
Liberal-Republican Union politicians
Liberal Party (Chile, 1998) politicians
Deputies of the XXXVII Legislative Period of the National Congress of Chile
Deputies of the XXXVIII Legislative Period of the National Congress of Chile
Deputies of the XXXIX Legislative Period of the National Congress of Chile
Deputies of the XL Legislative Period of the National Congress of Chile
Deputies of the XLI Legislative Period of the National Congress of Chile
Deputies of the XLII Legislative Period of the National Congress of Chile
Deputies of the XLIII Legislative Period of the National Congress of Chile
Presidents of the Senate of Chile
University of Chile alumni